Govrlevo is a small village in the municipality of Sopište, North Macedonia. Govrlevo is famous for Adam of Macedonia (or "Adam of Govrlevo"), a Neolithic sculpture found by the archaeologist Milosh Bilbija from the Skopje City Museum, and is more than 6.000 years old.

Demographics
According to the 2002 census, the village had a total of 30 inhabitants. Ethnic groups in the village include:

Macedonians 28
Serbs 2

Notable people
Blagica Pavlovska, a famous Macedonian folk-singer was born in Govrlevo.

References

Villages in Sopište Municipality